Çariýar Abdurahmanowiç  Muhadow (born 12 November 1969) is a former Turkmen footballer.

Club career
Muhadow began his career playing for Pamir Dushanbe in the Soviet Top League and later played for Lada Togliatti in the Russian Premier League. He also had a spell with Ankaragücü in the Turkish Super Lig.

International career
Muhadow made several appearances for the senior Turkmenistan national football team from 1992 to 1999, and is one of the team's leading goal-scorers with 13 goals.

Personal life
His son Süleýman Muhadow is an international footballer for Turkmenistan.

References

External links

1969 births
Living people
Soviet footballers
Sportspeople from Ashgabat
Turkmenistan footballers
Association football forwards
Footballers at the 1994 Asian Games
Asian Games competitors for Turkmenistan
Turkmenistan expatriate footballers
Expatriate footballers in Turkey
Turkmenistan expatriate sportspeople in Turkey
Expatriate footballers in Russia
Turkmenistan expatriate sportspeople in Russia
Expatriate footballers in Kazakhstan
Turkmenistan international footballers
Soviet Top League players
Russian Premier League players
Süper Lig players
FK Köpetdag Aşgabat players
CSKA Pamir Dushanbe players
MKE Ankaragücü footballers
FC Lada-Tolyatti players
FC Nisa Aşgabat players
FC Vostok players
FC Atyrau players